Network interface may refer to:

 Network interface controller, a computer hardware component that connects a computer to a computer network
 Network interface device, a device that serves as the demarcation point between a telephone carrier's local loop and the customer's wiring
 Virtual network interface, an abstract virtualized representation of a computer network interface
 Loopback interface, a virtual network interface that connects a host to itself